Pengjia Islet, also known as P'eng-chia Hsü, Hōka-sho, Agincourt, Dashihshan Islet, Chaolai Islet, P'eng-chia Yü or Pengchia Islet, is an islet north of Taiwan and is administered under Zhongzheng District, Keelung City. It is under Taiwanese military control and cannot be visited by ordinary citizens.

History
In September 1984, forty plus fishing boats from Japan intruded on the territorial waters of Pengchia Islet (Pengjia Islet). Their catch was estimated to be worth 20 million TWD.

On 7 September 2012 and again on 9 April 2016, President Ma Ying-jeou visited Pengjia Islet.

Geography
Pengjia Islet part of Zhongzheng, Keelung, Taiwan (ROC). The islet is located to the northeast of Keelung. The islet is surrounded by cliffs on its eastern, southern and northern sides. On the western side, the sea is full of reef and rocks. The only safe way to land on the island is via the dock on the western side.

Climate

Demographics
There are no long-term residents on the islet. As of 2002, there were about 40 itinerant residents living on the island, who are mostly employees of the weather observatory and coast guard divisions.

The island had over 100 inhabitants in the 1890s, when George MacKay wrote From Far Formosa (see page 185).

Infrastructures
 Pengjia Lighthouse

Maps

See also
 List of islands of Taiwan
 List of Taiwanese superlatives

References

External links

 Pengjia Islet: An Introduction, Directorate General of Customs, Republic of China

Islands of Taiwan
Islands of the East China Sea
Landforms of Keelung